Clyde Smith may refer to:

 Clyde B. Smith (1906–1976), American football player, coach, and college athletics administrator
 Clyde H. Smith (1876–1940), United States Representative from Maine
 Clyde E. Smith (1897–1971), Justice of the Supreme Court of Texas
 Clyde Smith (American football) (1904–1982), American football center in the National Football League
 Clyde Smith (footballer) (1901–1935), Australian rules footballer
 Clyde Smith (baseball), American baseball player